Further Definitions is a 1962 jazz album by Benny Carter and his orchestra, rereleased on CD in 1997 coupled with his follow-up album, 1966's Additions to Further Definitions.  The earlier album features an all-star octet that includes Coleman Hawkins, with whom Carter had recorded in Paris in 1937, using the same configuration of instruments: four saxophones, piano, guitar, bass, and drums.

Reception

The Penguin Guide to Jazz selected this album as part of its suggested "Core Collection", calling it "a good value purchase."

Track listing
Further Definitions
"Honeysuckle Rose" (Andy Razaf–Fats Waller) – 3:50
"The Midnight Sun Will Never Set" (Jones–Cochran–Salvador) – 3:57
"Crazy Rhythm" (Caesar–Meyer–Kahn) – 3:23
"Blue Star" (Carter) – 5:19
"Cotton Tail" (Ellington) – 4:24
"Body and Soul" (Green–Sour–Heyman–Eyton) – 4:09
"Cherry" (Redman–Gilbert) – 4:52
"Doozy" (Carter) – 3:32 
Additions to Further Definitions
"Fantastic, That's You" (Cates–Greene–Thiele) – 6:11
"Come on Back" (Carter) – 4:14
"We Were in Love" (Carter) – 4:27
"If Dreams Come True" (Sampson–Goodman–Mills) – 5:49
"Prohibido" (Carter) – 3:20
"Doozy" (Carter) – 5:33
"Rock Bottom" (Carter) – 4:14
"Titmouse" (Carter) – 3:02

1–8 recorded in 1961 in New York City, on 13 November (1–3, 7) and 15 November (4–6, 8).9–16 recorded in 1966 in Los Angeles, on 2 March (9, 10–13) and 4 March (11, 14–16).Solo Order, by Track:
 Rouse, Woods, Hawkins, Carter
 Hawkins, Katz, Carter
 Hawkins, Woods, Rouse, Carter, Katz
 Hawkins, Carter, Katz, Carter (ad-libbing)
 Hawkins, Carter, Rouse, Woods, Hawkins, Katz
 Woods, Rouse, Carter, Hawkins
 Carter (Intro), Rouse, Carter, Rouse, Woods, Hawkins
 Katz, Woods, Hawkins, Carter, Rouse, Katz

PersonnelFurther DefinitionsBenny Carter – alto saxophone
Phil Woods – alto saxophone
Coleman Hawkins – tenor saxophone
Charlie Rouse – tenor saxophone
John Collins – guitar
Dick Katz – piano
Jimmy Garrison – bass
Jo Jones – drumsAdditions to Further Definitions''
Benny Carter – alto saxophone
Bud Shank – alto saxophone
Teddy Edwards – tenor saxophone
Buddy Collette – tenor saxophone (9–10, 12–13)
Bill Perkins – tenor saxophone (11, 14–16)
Bill Hood – baritone saxophone
Barney Kessel – guitar (9–10, 12–13)
Mundell Lowe – guitar (11, 14–16)
Don Abney – piano
Ray Brown – bass
Alvin Stoller – drums

Production
Johnny Cue - engineer
Pete Turner - photography

References

External links
Impulse!/Verve page

1962 albums
Benny Carter albums
Impulse! Records albums
2007 compilation albums
Albums produced by Bob Thiele
Albums produced by George Cates